Frederick C. Hatfield (October 21, 1942 – May 14, 2017), nicknamed Dr. Squat, was an American world champion powerlifter and PhD holder in sports sciences. He was also the co-founder and president of the International Sports Sciences Association, an organization of fitness experts which certifies personal fitness trainers from around the world. He went on to make the ICOPRO bodybuilding protein and supplements for Vince McMahon's World Bodybuilding Federation. After the promotion folded, McMahon continued to market the product until 1995.

Personal life and career 
Hatfield was born in Williamstown, Massachusetts in 1942. He graduated from Cromwell High School. He served in the United States Marine Corps where he worked with the Office of Naval Intelligence in the Philippines  until 1964, when he enrolled in Southern Connecticut State University.

Upon graduating, Hatfield earned his Bachelor of Science degree in health, physical education and recreation. He then attended the University of Illinois at Urbana-Champaign, where he earned his Master's degree in the social sciences of sport. He went on to earn his PhD in psychology, sociology and motor learning from Temple University in Philadelphia.

Hatfield held positions at Newark State College, Bowie State University, and the University of Wisconsin–Madison. He taught undergraduate students, and conducted research in sport psychology. He has written over 60 books, some of them best-sellers. His best-selling seminal work Bodybuilding:A Scientific Approach set the standard for many fitness books today.  He wrote hundreds of academic and fitness articles which have been cited by experts, including Anabolic Steroids expert James Wright.

He trained hundreds of professional athletes including Mr. Olympia winner Lee Haney,  Evander Holyfield, and Lyle Alzado.

He was diagnosed with metastatic skeletal cancer in 2012 and was advised by 3 doctors that he had 3 months to live. However, he told CBN News that he had tried to slow progression with a ketogenic diet and the cancer went away completely. 

He was inducted in the National Fitness Hall of Fame in 2016.

Hatfield died May 14th, 2017 from sudden heart failure at age 74.

Accomplishments in powerlifting 
As a powerlifter, Hatfield won 2 IPF World Powerlifting Championships titles in 1983 and 1986. At the age of 45, he set a squat world record by lifting  in the  weight class, which at the time was the heaviest squat in history regardless of bodyweight. He weighed 255 lbs.

References

External links 
 DrSquat.com  (personal website)
 Interview

1942 births
2017 deaths
American powerlifters
Bowie State University faculty
World Games silver medalists
Competitors at the 1981 World Games